Philip Thomas Hollobone (born 7 November 1964) is a British Conservative Party politician and former investment banker. He has been the Member of Parliament for Kettering since the 2005 general election.

Early life
Hollobone was born on 7 November 1964 in Bromley, Kent. He was privately educated at Dulwich College, where he was a contemporary of former UKIP leader Nigel Farage. He went on to study at Lady Margaret Hall, Oxford where he was awarded a BA degree in Modern History and Economics. He was a member of the Oxford University branch of the Conservative Monday Club – a 'hard right' pressure group that was later disassociated from the Conservative Party over its policies, such as the voluntary repatriation of ethnic minorities.

In 1984, he worked as a voluntary teacher in Honduras with a Baptist mission. He worked for various companies as an industry research analyst and investment banker between 1987 and 2003 and was in the Territorial Army between 1987 and 1995.

Political career
His elected political career began in the London Borough of Bromley, where he served as a councillor for the Martins Hill & Town ward between 1990 and 1994, when he did not stand again and the Liberal Democrat candidate won his former seat. He unsuccessfully contested Lewisham East at the 1997 General Election where he was defeated by the sitting Labour MP Bridget Prentice by 12,127 votes. In 1998 he sought re-election to the London Borough of Bromley in his former ward, but was defeated by the Liberal Democrats.

He was later selected as the Conservative candidate for the marginal Northamptonshire constituency of Kettering for the 2001 general election; he lost to incumbent Labour MP Phil Sawford by 665 votes. Following his defeat, Hollobone moved to Kettering and secured election in 2003 to Kettering Borough Council—first representing the rural ward of Buccleuch, before representing the suburban ward of Piper's Hill from 2007. He also became Vice Chairman of the Kettering Conservative Constituency Association in 2002. He was re-elected as a councillor in 2011, but did not re-stand in 2015.

Hollobone secured election to the House of Commons at his third attempt, during the 2005 general election, defeating Phil Sawford by 3,301 votes. He made his maiden speech on 24 May 2005.

Some of his subsequent speeches were not well received. In 2006, he was one of three new MPs specifically mentioned in an article in The Times about manipulating the performance figures for the Theyworkforyou website. The article claimed new MPs boosted "their ratings on the internet by saying very little, very often". Whilst Hollobone's frequent "speeches" might give the appearance  of "Churchill or Gladstone", many were interventions of only two or three sentences. In response, Hollobone said that as a new MP he tried to speak as often as possible on behalf of constituents and take part in many different debates.

Hollobone was rated as the Conservatives' most rebellious MP in 2010. He stated that his job is to "represent constituents in Westminster, it's not to represent Westminster in the constituency".

He has attempted to reintroduce national service. His private member's bill on capital punishment received its first reading in the House of Commons on 24 June 2013, but was withdrawn, and so did not receive a second reading. Similarly, his Young Offenders (Parental Responsibility) Bill, Foreign National Offenders (Exclusion from the United Kingdom) Bill, Fishing Grounds and Territorial Waters (Repatriation) Bill, Asylum Seekers (Return to Nearest Safe Country) Bill, BBC Licence Fee (Civil Debt) Bill and Equality and Diversity (Reform) Bill, all due for second reading on 28 February 2014, were all withdrawn. His European Communities Act 1972 (Repeal) Bill failed to progress to a vote.

He was re-elected at the 2010 general election, 2015 general election and 2017 general election.

In March 2015, Hollobone was criticised by The Independent for being one of 4 MPs who voted against a Bill to increase the powers of the House of Lords to penalise peers who had broken the law and expel the worst offenders. This followed an expenses scandal relating to the former peer Lord Hanningfield. Hollobone argued the act could be used to discriminate against older male peers.

In February 2018, following the announcement that Northamptonshire County Council had brought in a "section 114" notice, putting it in special measures following a crises in its finances, Hollobone was one of seven local MPs who released a statement arguing that the problems with the authority were down to mismanagement from the Conservative councillors who led it rather than funding cuts from the Conservative Government. They further argued that government commissioners should take over the running of the council.

In March 2018, he joined three other Conservative backbench MPs in "talking out" a bill by Green Party MP Caroline Lucas, which aimed to reverse private sector involvement in the NHS. By filibustering for three-and-a-half hours, Lucas was left with just 17 minutes to present her bill, which was subsequently shelved without a vote.

In Parliament he serves on the Panel of Chairs, for which he receives an annual payment of £15,000 (in addition to his MP's salary of £77,379). He has previously been a member of the Transport Committee and the Backbench Business Committee.

Expenses
In April 2009, Hollobone was reported to be the thriftiest Member of Parliament in terms of expenses: the average MP claimed £144,176 whereas Hollobone's expenses bill amounted to £47,737. In response to a written question by Hollobone, the expenses claimed for public duties by former Prime Ministers after they had left office was revealed to the public. In November 2017, Hollobone was reported to be the MP who had benefited from the largest sum of expenses that he was not entitled to, but had not been forced to pay the money back. The unjustified claim of £17,000 was written off because the expenses watchdog admitted that it should have picked up on the error earlier.

Political views
Hollobone is regarded as being on the right wing of the Conservative Party, and is a member of the socially conservative Cornerstone Group. He has advocated the privatisation of the BBC and policies such as bringing back capital punishment and military conscription.

In 2013, Hollobone was one of four MPs who camped outside Parliament in a move to facilitate parliamentary debate on what they called an "Alternative Queen’s Speech" – an attempt to show what a future Conservative government might deliver. Some 42 policies were listed including reintroduction of the death penalty and conscription, privatising the BBC, banning the burka in public places and preparation to leave the European Union.

Hollobone was a supporter of the Better Off Out campaign, which campaigned for Britain's withdrawal from the EU. The Eurosceptic UK Independence Party did not field a candidate against Hollobone in the 2010 general election and subsequently campaigned for his re-election as a result of his Eurosceptic views. Hollobone continued to deny speculation that he would be the most likely MP to follow Douglas Carswell and Mark Reckless in defecting to UKIP and remained a Conservative MP. UKIP did not field a candidate against him again in the 2017 general election.

Burqas
In February 2010, Hollobone described the wearing of burqas as like "going round wearing a paper bag over your head" and expressed his "huge sympathy" with those calling for a ban on the garments. He went on to say that he would refuse to speak with constituents wearing burkas if they came to see him, although he did not cite any examples of where this had happened in the past and he was told by the advocacy group Liberty that he could face legal action if he was to do so. 

On 30 June 2010, Hollobone introduced the Face Coverings (Regulation) Bill, which would regulate the use of certain facial coverings, including the burka, in public. However, his bill did not progress further towards adoption.

Personal life
He married Donna Cooksey in St John's church, Cranford in June 2001.
They had a son named Thomas in June 2004 and a daughter named Emily in 2006 and lived in Barton Seagrave. They separated in 2012 and divorced in 2013. Hollobone has played occasionally for Kettering Rugby Football Club in the past and served as a special constable with British Transport Police for six years until asked to resign in 2015 due to new rules about police officers taking part in politics.

References

External links

 
 Profile at the Conservative Party
 Guardian Unlimited Politics - Ask Aristotle: Philip Hollobone MP
 

1964 births
Alumni of Lady Margaret Hall, Oxford
British Parachute Regiment soldiers
Conservative Party (UK) MPs for English constituencies
Councillors in Northamptonshire
Councillors in the London Borough of Bromley
British critics of Islam
Islamic clothing controversy in Europe
Living people
People educated at Dulwich College
UK MPs 2005–2010
UK MPs 2010–2015
UK MPs 2015–2017
UK MPs 2017–2019
UK MPs 2019–present
Members of the Freedom Association
British special constables
People from Barton Seagrave
Artists' Rifles soldiers
20th-century British Army personnel
British Eurosceptics